Anand Gopal is a writer for The New Yorker magazine and author of No Good Men Among the Living: America, the Taliban and the War Through Afghan Eyes, which describes the travails of three Afghans caught in the war on terror. It was a finalist for the 2015 Pulitzer Prize for general non-fiction and the 2014 National Book Award for non-fiction. He has won many major journalism prizes, including the National Magazine Award, for his magazine writing on conflict in the Middle East.

Career 
Gopal is notable for his writing on conflict and revolutions. In 2017, for The New York Times Magazine he helped expose the vast number of civilians killed by U.S. aerial campaigns in Iraq and Syria. He has reported extensively from those countries, including a feature on the crimes of anti-ISIS militias for the Atlantic, which won a George Polk Award.

He is believed to be one of the few Western journalists to have embedded with the Taliban, an experience that forms part of the basis of No Good Men Among the Living. In 2012 Gopal reported for Harper's Magazine on the town of Taftanaz in Syria, which suffered a massacre at the hands of the regime of Bashar al-Assad. In 2014 he reported for Harper's on a murderous U.S.-backed police chief in Kandahar, Afghanistan.

In January 2010 Gopal published a story about secret prisons in Afghanistan, run by JSOC Joint Special Operations Command.

In the September 13, 2021 issue of the New Yorker magazine Gopal erotr an article entitled "The Other Afghan Women" a feature in the New Yorkers "A Reporter at Large" beat.  The article most likely has some overlap with his previous works as his previous experience certainly informed his present writing although this time he is writing just as the Taliban are retaking much of Afghanistan and US Forces are writ large leaving.  The article is a study in the nuance and complexity involved with The American War and the near impossibility for an outcome that benefits all parties. The article primarily traces the life of an Afghan Woman and her lifetime experiences with a war that rages all around her from birth forward.  One in which as the metropolitan areas of Afghanistan see major gains in women's rights this comes at the cost of the life of those in the countryside.

Gopal conducted a rare interview with Gulbuddin Hekmatyar the reclusive leader of one of the Taliban's most important allies.

Gopal was a resident of Manhattan when terrorists attacked the World Trade Center on September 11, 2001.

Awards 
His book was a finalist for the 2015 Pulitzer Prize for general non-fiction, the 2014 National Book Award and the 2015 Helen Bernstein Award. It was awarded the 2015 Ridenhour Prize for demonstrating "why the United States' emphasis on counterterrorism at the expense of nation-building and reconciliation inadvertently led to the Taliban's resurgence after 2001."

Bibliography

Books

Essays and reporting 
 
 
———————
Notes

References

External links

American reporters and correspondents
The New Yorker people
Living people
Year of birth missing (living people)
American journalists of Asian descent
American writers of Indian descent